Feng Jinglan (9 March 1898 – 29 September 1976), courtesy name Huaixi, was a Chinese mineralogist and geologist. He was one of the founders of mineralogy in China. He was an academician of the Chinese Academy of Sciences.

Biography 
His elder brother Feng Youlan (1895–1990) was a philosopher. His younger sister Feng Yuanjun (1900–1974) was a writer. He secondary studied at Henan Provincial Second School in Kaifeng. In 1916, he was admitted to Peking University. In 1918, he pursued advanced studies in the United States on government scholarships, first studying mine geology in Colorado School of Mines and then studying mineralogy, petrology and physiography in Columbia University with a master's degree in 1923.

He returned to China in 1923 and that same year became an instructor at Zhongzhou University. In his spare time, he studied the sand dunes near Kaifeng and explored the control of the Yellow River. In 1927, he went to Heishanzhai in Changping, Hebei to investigate the geology of gold deposits, which was one of the earliest modern deposit geological work in China. 

In 1927, he was recruited as a technician of Guangzhou Geological Survey Institute, where he investigated the geology and mineral resources along the railway near Guangzhou. He discovered and named Danxia landform in Mount Danxia of Renhua County.

In 1929, he moved to Peiyang University, he remained at the university until 1933. During this period, he investigated the geology and mineral resources along the Shenyang–Haikou railway in Liaoning, the genesis of Xuanlong Iron Ore in Hebei, and the geology of Northern Shaanxi. In 1933, he joined the faculty of Tsinghua University. From 1933 to 1937, during the summer vacation, he and others investigated the geology and mineral resources of Pingquan, Datong, Zhaoyuan and Mount Tai. 

After the outbreak of the Second Sino-Japanese War, Tsinghua University was forced to move south to form National Southwestern Associated University with Peking University in Kunming, where he concurrently served as dean of the Institute of Technology and head of the Department of Mining of Yunnan University. During this period, he mainly studied the copper mines in Sichuan and Yunnan. After war, he moved back to Beijing with the university.

After the establishment of the Communist State, he was hired as a professor by Beijing Institute of Geology (now China University of Geosciences (Beijing)). In 1966, Mao Zedong launched the Cultural Revolution, Feng was labeled as a "reactionary academic authority". In November 1969, he was sent to the May Seventh Cadre Schools to do farm works with his wife in Xiajiang County, Jiangxi, working until the spring of 1972.

On 29 September 1976, he died of a heart attack in Beijing, aged 78.

Legacy 
After Feng's death, his children donated 100,000 yuan saved during his lifetime to China University of Geosciences (Beijing) in October 1998 to establish the "Feng Jinglan Prize" to reward teachers and students with outstanding academic achievements who have made outstanding contributions to the development of geological education.

Honours and awards 
 1957 Member of the Chinese Academy of Sciences (CAS)

References

Bibliography

External links 
Biography of Feng Jinglan on the official website of the Chinese Academy of Sciences 

1898 births
1976 deaths
People from Tanghe County
Scientists from Hebei
Chinese mineralogists
Chinese geologists
Colorado School of Mines alumni
Columbia University alumni
Academic staff of Peiyang University
Academic staff of Tsinghua University
Academic staff of the National Southwestern Associated University
Academic staff of Yunnan University
Members of the Chinese Academy of Sciences
National University of Peking alumni